African popular music (also styled Afropop,  Afro-pop or Afro pop), like African traditional music, is vast and varied. Most contemporary genres of African popular music build on cross-pollination with western popular music. Many genres of popular music like blues, jazz, afrobeats, salsa, zouk, and rumba derive to varying degrees on musical traditions from Africa, taken to the Americas by enslaved Africans. These rhythms and sounds have subsequently been adapted by newer genres like rock, and rhythm and blues. Likewise, African popular music has adopted elements, particularly the musical instruments and recording studio techniques of western music. The term does not refer to a specific style or sound but is used as a general term for African popular music.

Influence of Afro-Cuban music

Cuban music has been popular in Sub-Saharan Africa since the mid-twentieth century. It was Cuban music, more than any other, that provided the initial template for Afropop. To the Africans, clave-based Cuban popular music sounded both familiar and exotic. The Encyclopedia of Africa v. 1. states:

"Beginning in the 1940s, Afro-Cuban [son] groups such as Septeto Habanero and Trio Matamoros gained widespread popularity in the Congo region as a result of airplay over Radio Congo Belge, a powerful radio station based in Léopoldville (now Kinshasa DRC). A proliferation of music clubs, recording studios, and concert appearances of Cuban bands in Léopoldville spurred on the Cuban music trend during the late 1940s and 1950s."

Congolese bands started doing Cuban covers and singing the lyrics phonetically. Soon, they were creating their own original Cuban-like compositions, with French lyrics. The Congolese called this new music rumba, although it was really based on the son. The Africans adapted guajeos to electric guitars, and gave them their own regional flavor. The guitar-based music gradually spread out from the Congo, increasingly taking on local sensibilities. This process eventually resulted in the establishment of several different distinct regional genres, such as soukous.

Cuban popular music played a major role in the development of many contemporary genres of African popular music. John Storm Roberts states: "It was the Cuban connection, but increasingly also New York salsa, that provided the major and enduring influences—the ones that went deeper than earlier imitation or passing fashion. The Cuban connection began very early and was to last at least twenty years, being gradually absorbed and re-Africanized." The re-working of Afro-Cuban rhythmic patterns by Africans brings the rhythms full circle.

The re-working of the harmonic patterns reveals a striking difference in perception. The I, IV, V, IV, harmonic progression, commonly used in Cuban music, is heard in pop music all across the African continent, thanks to the influence of Cuban music. Those chords move in accordance with the basic tenets of Western music theory. However, as Gerhard Kubik points out, performers of African popular music do not necessarily perceive these progressions in the same way: "The harmonic cycle of C-F-G-F [I-IV-V-IV] prominent in Congo/Zaire popular music simply cannot be defined as a progression from tonic to subdominant to dominant and back to subdominant (on which it ends) because in the performer's appreciation they are of equal status, and not in any hierarchical order as in Western music."

The largest wave of Cuban-based music to hit Africa was in the form of salsa. In 1974 the Fania All Stars performed in Zaire (known today as the Democratic Republic of the Congo), Africa, at the 80,000-seat Stadu du Hai in Kinshasa. This was captured on film and released as Live In Africa (Salsa Madness in the UK). The Zairean appearance occurred  at a music festival held in conjunction with the Muhammad Ali/George Foreman heavyweight title fight. Local genres were already well established by this time. Even so, salsa caught on in many African countries, especially in the Senegambia and Mali. Cuban music had been the favorite of Senegal's nightspot in the 1950s to 1960s. The Senegalese band Orchestra Baobab plays in a basic salsa style with congas and timbales, but with the addition of Wolof and Mandinka instruments and lyrics.

According to Lise Waxer: "African salsa points not so much to a return of salsa to African soil (Steward 1999: 157) but to a complex process of cultural appropriation between two regions of the so-called Third World." Since the mid-1990s African artists have also been very active through the super-group Africando, where African and New York musicians mix with leading African singers such as Bambino Diabate, Ricardo Lemvo, Ismael Lo and Salif Keita. It is still common today for an African artist to record a salsa tune, and add their own particular regional touch to it.

Genres
Genres of African popular music include:

See also
African traditional music
African-American popular music

References

Further reading 
 Afropop! An Illustrated Guide to Contemporary African Music by Sean Barlow & Banning Eyre. (Book Sales August 1995) , 
Afrobeats: All you need to know

 
African music